Viktor Avbelj (February 26, 1914 – April 6, 1993) was a Yugoslav Partisan and Slovenian politician. He was a member of the League of Communists of Slovenia.

As a student, he joined the Communist Party in 1937. From September to December 1942, he was the first political commissar of the Gubec Brigade, and afterwards the political commissar of the 1st operational zone, and from July 1943, the 15th division. In July 1943, while observing the enemy's positions near Selah pri Šumberk, he narrowly escaped death in a shelling. From September 1944 to March 1945 he was the political commissar of the 9th Corps of the NOVJ, and then until May 1945 the political commissar of the Main Staff of the NOV and POS and the Slovenian representative at the 4th Army of the Yugoslav Army. He was a recipient of the Order of the People's Hero along with other honors for his Partisan activities during WWII.

From May to August 1945, he was the deputy head of OZNA for Slovenia. Until November 1945, he performed the duties of organizational secretary of the Central Committee of the Communist Party. For a year after, he was the secretary of the District Committee of the Party for its Maribor division. From November 1946 to March 1948, he was Prosecutor for the State Security Administration.

He served as the president of the executive council of the Socialist Republic of Slovenia (SRS) from June 25, 1962, to 1965 after previously serving as vice-president. He was preceded by Boris Kraigher and succeeded by Janko Smole. From 1979 to 1984 he was He was the chairman of the SRS presidency, a member of the federation council from 1963 to 1973 and then again from 1984 to 1990. He was one of the key planners of the economic development of the Republic of Slovenia.

On April 3, 1993, he shot himself with a pistol and died a few days later.

References

Presidents of the Executive Council of the Socialist Republic of Slovenia
1914 births
1993 deaths
Recipients of the Order of the People's Hero
League of Communists of Slovenia politicians
Slovenian politicians who committed suicide
Yugoslav Partisans members